The Rotaliida are an order of Foraminifera, characterized by multilocular tests (shells) composed of bilamellar perforate hyaline lamellar calcite that may be optically radial or granular.

In form, rotaliid tests are  typically enrolled, but may be reduced to biserial or uniserial, or may be encrusting with proliferated chambers. Chambers may be simple or subdivided by secondary partitions; the surface is smooth, papillate, costate, striate, or cancellate; the aperture is simple or with an internal toothplate, entosolenian tube, or hemicylindrical structure; it may have an internal canal or stolen systems.

Rotaliids are primarily oceanic benthos, although some are common in shallower estuarine waters.  They also include many important fossils, such as the nummulitids.

Taxonomy
The Rotaliida are now divided into the following superfamilies:

References

External links
Suborder ROTALIINA Delage and Hérouard, 1896 (Geological Survey of Iran)

 
Foraminifera orders